Luke Williams is a Scottish author who received the Goldsmiths Prize in 2022 for Diego Garcia, which he co-authored with Natasha Soobramanien.

References 

Living people
Goldsmiths Prize winners
Year of birth missing (living people)
Scottish writers